Dana Max Stein (born September 19, 1958) is an American politician from Maryland and a member of the Democratic Party. He is currently serving in the Maryland House of Delegates, representing District 11 in Baltimore County.

Background
Dana Stein grew up in northwest Baltimore County and attended public schools, graduating from Milford Mill High School. He has a B.A. in government from Harvard College, a J.D. degree from Columbia Law School, and a Masters in Public Affairs from the Woodrow Wilson School at Princeton University.

Dana practiced law for several years at Squire, Sanders & Dempsey in Washington, D.C., working on antitrust, banking, international trade and pro bono matters.

In 1993, Dana started Civc Works, Baltimore's Urban Service Corps.

In the legislature
After Delegate Michael Finifter was appointed as a judge for the third judicial circuit court of Baltimore County, Delegate Stein served a partial term from 2002 to 2003. Stein is a member of the Environmental Matters Committee.

Electoral history
2010 General Election Results for Maryland House of Delegates – District 11
Voters to choose three:
{| class="wikitable"
!Name
!Votes
!Percent
!Outcome
|-
|-
|Jon S. Cardin (D)
|32,211
|  24.33%
|   Won
|-
|-
|Dan K. Morhaim (D)
|28,129
|  21.25%
|   Won
|-
|-
|Dana Stein (D)
|28,034
|  21.17%
|   Won
|-
|-
|Carol C. Byrd (R)
|13,952
|  10.54%
|   Lost
|-
|-
|J. Michael Collins (R)
|13,971
|  10.55%
|   Lost
|-
|-
|Steven J. Smith (R)
|13,647
|  10.31%
|   Lost
|-
|-
|Brandon Brooks (L)
|2,341
|  1.77%
|   Lost
|-
|-
|Other write-ins
|115
|  0.09%
|   Lost
|-
|}
2010 Primary Election Results for Maryland House of Delegates – District 11
Voters to choose three:
{| class="wikitable"
!Name
!Votes
!Percent
!Outcome
|-
|-
|Jon S. Cardin (D)
|13,539
|  33.97%
|   Won
|-
|-
|Regg Hatcher (D)
|3,037
|  7.62%
|   Lost
|-
|-
|Dan K. Morhaim (D)
|11,422
|  28.66%
|   Won
|-
|-
|Dana Stein (D)
|11,855
|  29.75%
|   Won
|}

2006 General Election Results for Maryland House of Delegates – District 11
Voters to choose three:
{| class="wikitable"
!Name
!Votes
!Percent
!Outcome
|-
|-
|Jon S. Cardin (D)
|32,747
|  25.8%
|   Won
|-
|-
|Dan K. Morhaim (D)
|31,185
|  24.6%
|   Won
|-
|-
|Dana Stein (D)
|30,481
|  24.0%
|   Won
|-
|-
|Patrick V. Dyer (R)
|13,904
|  11.0%
|   Lost
|-
|-
|Patrick Abbondandalo (R)
|12,822
|  10.1%
|   Lost
|-
|-
|Dave Goldsmith (G)
|5,435
|  4.3%
|   Lost
|-
|Other Write-Ins
|181
|  0.1%
|   Lost
|}

2006 Primary Election Results for Maryland House of Delegates – District 11
Voters to choose three:
{| class="wikitable"
!Name
!Votes
!Percent
!Outcome
|-
|-
|Jon S. Cardin (D)
|11,815
|  22.5%
|   Won
|-
|-
|Dan K. Morhaim (D)
|10,146
|  19.3%
|   Won
|-
|-
|Dana Stein (D)
|6,824
|  13.0%
|   Won
|-
|-
|Rick Yaffe (D)
|6,634
|  12.6%
|   Lost
|-
|-
|Sharon H. Bloom (D)
|4,436
|  8.4%
|   Lost
|-
|-
|Jason A. Frank (D)
|3,300
|  6.3%
|   Lost
|-
|-
|Julian Earl Jones (D)
|3,291
|  6.3%
|   Lost
|-
|-
|Theodore Levin (D)
|2,271
|  4.3%
|   Lost
|-
|-
|Noel Levy (D)
|1,075
|  2.0%
|   Lost
|-
|-
|Stephen Knable (D)
|979
|  1.9%
|   Lost
|-
|-
|Zhanna Anapolsy-Maydanich (D)
|672
|  1.3%
|   Lost
|-
|-
|Ivan Goldstein (D)
|579
|  1.1%
|   Lost
|-
|-
|V. Michael Koyfman (D)
|526
|  1.0%
|   Lost
|}

2002 Primary Election Results for Maryland House of Delegates – District 11
Voters to choose three:
{| class="wikitable"
!Name
!Votes
!Percent
!Outcome
|-
|-
|Bobby A. Zirkin (D)
|10,198
|  22.9%
|   Won
|-
|-
|Dan K. Morhaim (D)
|7,922
|  17.8%
|   Won
|-
|-
|Jon S. Cardin (D)
|7,776
|  17.4%
|   Won
|-
|-
|Dana Stein (D)
|6,576
|  14.8%
|   Lost
|-
|-
|Melvin Mintz (D)
|6,311
|  14.2%
|   Lost
|-
|-
|Theodore Levin (D)
|3,349
|  7.5%
|   Lost
|-
|-
|Barney J. Wilson (D)
|2,438
|  5.5%
|   Lost
|}

References

External links

Living people
1958 births
Democratic Party members of the Maryland House of Delegates
Harvard University alumni
Columbia Law School alumni
Princeton School of Public and International Affairs alumni
21st-century American politicians